Yangdong Market station is a station of Gwangju Metro Line 1 in Seo-dong, Seo District, Gwangju, South Korea.

The station name comes from the nearby Yangdong Market.

Station layout

Exits

External links
  Cyber station information from Gwangju Metropolitan Rapid Transit Corporation
  Cyber station information from Gwangju Metropolitan Rapid Transit Corporation

Gwangju Metro stations
Buk District, Gwangju
Railway stations opened in 2004